Leigh McMillan (born 24 October 1980) is a British sailor who competed in the 2004 and 2008 Summer Olympics.

McMillan has skippered The Wave, Muscat since the 2011 Extreme Sailing Series.

In 2015, it was announced that McMillan was set to be the backup helm on Landrover BAR, the British challenger for the 35th Americas Cup in 2017.

References

External links 
 
 
 
 

1980 births
Living people
Olympic sailors of Great Britain
British male sailors (sport)
Sailors at the 2004 Summer Olympics – Tornado
Sailors at the 2008 Summer Olympics – Tornado
Extreme Sailing Series sailors
2021 America's Cup sailors